Lone Star is a 1952 American Western film starring Clark Gable, Ava Gardner, Broderick Crawford, Ed Begley, and Lionel Barrymore (in his final role) as President Andrew Jackson. The film also marks the first (uncredited) screen appearance by then-13-year-old George Hamilton, playing beside Barrymore in the role of Jackson's servant.

The movie is considered both a Western and a romance, set in Texas shortly before statehood.

Plot
Devereaux Burke (Clark Gable) gets a personal request from former President Andrew Jackson (Lionel Barrymore) to facilitate the annexation of Texas into the United States. Opposition to annexation is gaining favor because it is mistakenly believed that Texas pioneer Sam Houston (Moroni Olsen) opposes statehood.

The opposition leader is wealthy rancher Thomas Craden (Broderick Crawford), but when Craden is ambushed by Comanches, Dev comes to his rescue. Dev and Craden travel to Austin, where they meet Martha Ronda (Ava Gardner), who runs the local newspaper. Craden does not know Dev supports annexation when he invites him to a dinner he planned that night for a number of senators at his home. When the senators will not all agree to vote against annexation, Craden refuses them permission to leave. Dev is allowed to leave, but soon returns with a group of armed men to rescue the senators and reveal his support for annexation.

The senators inform Dev that Sam Houston is on the other side of the Pecos River, negotiating a peace treaty with the Apache. Dev leaves to find Houston, but is followed by Craden. Dev and Craden find Houston with the Apache. Dev gets a signed letter from Houston telling of Houston's actual position, but the ink smears when Dev falls into a river while fleeing from Craden's men. Dev has difficulty persuading Martha that he is telling the truth, but after confirming the facts with Craden, she publishes the correct story about Houston's position.

When the people of Austin are told the truth of Houston's position, they rally in support of annexation. Craden resorts to force to stop the Texas Congress from voting on annexation. Dev is called on to organize the defense of the Texas Congress. Craden attacks the fort-like congress building with several dozen armed men on horseback. Dev leads the defenders as they repulse two waves of attack, but the battle begins to turn against them during the third wave of attack. Houston arrives with the Apache just in time to end the battle before any senators are killed. Dev and Craden fight each other hand-to-hand until Dev knocks out Craden. Annexation succeeds, Craden concedes, and Dev wins Martha over and saves the day.

Cast

 Clark Gable as Devereaux Burke (alias, Mr. Bill Jones)
 Ava Gardner as Martha Ronda
 Broderick Crawford as Thomas Craden
 Lionel Barrymore as Andrew Jackson
 Beulah Bondi as Minniver Bryan
 Ed Begley as Senator Anthony Demmet (credited as Claud Demmet)
 James Burke as Luther Kilgore
 William Farnum as Senator Tom Crockett
 Lowell Gilmore as Captain Charles Elliot
 Moroni Olsen as Sam Houston
 Russell Simpson as Senator Maynard Cole
 William Conrad as Mizette
 Lucius Cook as Seth Moulton
 Ralph Reed as Bud Yoakum
 Ric Roman as Gurau 
 Victor Sutherland as President Anson Jones
 Jonathan Cott as Ben McCulloch
 Charles Cane as Mr. Mayhew
 Nacho Galindo as Vincente 
 Trevor Bardette as Sid Yoakum
 Harry Woods as George Dellman
 Dudley Sadler as Ashbel Smith
 Emmett Lynn as Josh
 George Hamilton as Noah (uncredited)
 Mitchell Lewis as Senator (uncredited)

Reception
According to MGM records, the film made $2,478,000 in the US and Canada and $1,444,000 elsewhere, resulting in a profit of $990,000.

References

External links
 
 
 
 

1952 films
American black-and-white films
Films set in Texas
Films shot in Colorado
Metro-Goldwyn-Mayer films
Films directed by Vincent Sherman
1952 Western (genre) films
American Western (genre) films
Films scored by David Buttolph
Films with screenplays by Howard Estabrook
Films about Andrew Jackson
American historical films
1950s historical films
1950s English-language films
1950s American films